Yuval Heled  is a professor and lieutenant colonel in the IDF reserves. He is a consultant and lecturer in sports nutrition at the Sieim Campus in Israel. He served as the IDF's chief physiologist, chief scientist, and director of the Heller Institute for Medical Research at Tel Hashomer Hospital.

Heled holds a bachelor's degree in physical education from the Zinman College of Physical Education at the Wingate Institute and a bachelor's degree in law from the Ono Academic College. He is an associate professor at the Uniformed Services University of the Health Sciences in Bethesda, Maryland, and served as an associate professor in the Faculty of Medicine at the Hebrew University of Jerusalem. Heled has around 80 scientific publications in scientific journals.

Membership in organizations 
 Senior Fellow at the American College of Sports Medicine ACSM
 Member of the Consortium for Health and Physical Performance (CHAMP) of the USU School of Medicine in the United States
 Member of the Scientific Committee of the Institute of Military Medicine, Faculty of Medicine, The Hebrew University of Jerusalem
 Center for the Military Medicine Course at the Faculty of Medicine at the Hebrew University of Jerusalem
 Member of the editorial board of the Israeli Journal of Military Medicine (JIMM).

References 

Living people
Israeli scientists
Israeli officers
Hebrew University of Jerusalem alumni
Year of birth missing (living people)
Ono Academic College alumni